"Ashes to Ashes" is the 138th episode of Star Trek: Voyager, the 18th episode of the sixth season.

This episode features Seven of Nine mothering ex-Borg orphans, meanwhile USS Voyager encounters a unique alien species, the Kobali. This episode was nominated for an Emmy award for makeup, with a team including Michael Westmore.

This episode aired on the television channel UPN, on March 1, 2000.

Plot

An alien contacts Voyager, claiming to be a deceased member of the crew, Ensign Lyndsay Ballard, now known as Jhet'leya. She explains that an alien race, the Kobali, reanimated her after her coffin was jettisoned into space. The Kobali reproduce by altering the DNA of dead individuals of other races, although such people are (at least initially) prisoners of the Kobali so that they can more easily adjust to their new lives. Ballard escaped from her 'new' family, stole a ship, and spent six months searching for Voyager.

When she finds Voyager, she is under attack from a Kobali vessel. Disabling the pursuing vessel, she makes audio contact with Voyager—only to be disconnected when Mezoti, an adolescent former Borg drone, accidentally closes the channel in an attempt to notify Captain Janeway.

When contact is reestablished, Ballard is brought to Sickbay, where she retells the story of her death. Harry Kim, who was involved with Ballard, is present to confirm the details, and the Doctor confirms that the alien's DNA contains portions that match Ballard's medical records.

When the Captain clears Ballard for duty, she attempts to return to her "old" life, but finds adjustment difficult—the Doctor has managed to restore her physical appearance, but biologically, she is still Kobali (as there was not enough human DNA in the ensign's body to revert her). She discovers that fact for herself all too clearly when she attempts to eat her favorite food in the Mess Hall, and finds that it suddenly tastes "metallic" and unappealing.

Eventually, Q'Ret—Ballard's Kobali "father"—returns, demanding the return of his "daughter", Jhet'laya. After a tense meeting in the briefing room (which Ballard ends prematurely), she finds herself in the Mess Hall, depressed and isolated. When Harry Kim attempts to console her, and suggests that they alter one of Tuvok's meditation holoprograms as a prank, Ballard suffers a painful "reversion" of her Kobali physiology.

In Sickbay, the Doctor discovers that a pathogen that was introduced into Ballard's bloodstream is forcing Ballard's body to reject the Doctor's improvised "reconstructive surgery". Ballard must visit Sickbay twice daily if the treatments are to remain effective. Ballard loses her temper upon hearing that she would, essentially, be confined to sickbay for the rest of the 75-year journey, and lashes out vocally and physically, shouting angrily in untranslated Kobali.

Appalled at her new, more "volatile" Kobali personality, Ballard discovers that Voyager is no longer the home she once knew; corridors that she once walked with familiarity are now alien, she is unable to remember her human family due to the Kobali's alterations, and her new Kobali personality is too emotionally volatile.

When Q'Ret returns, with two other vessels, Ballard decides that she needs to leave—she no longer belongs on Voyager, and the ship will be destroyed if she stays. A distraught Harry Kim refuses to lose her again, but Ballard/Jhet'laya tells him that she was already lost to him when she died...but at least this time they got to say "goodbye".

Signalling the Kobali to break off their attack, Harry and Jhet'laya have one final moment together in the transporter room. Harry has been practicing his Kobali as a farewell surprise.

An amused Jhet'laya appreciates his efforts, but points out that instead of a touching farewell, he said "the comets are tiresome". The two share one final laugh and a kiss before Jhet'laya steps up to the transporter pad and beams over to the Kobali ship.

As Harry is seen looking over a hairbrush that used to belong to Ballard, Mezoti comes over to comment it is a pretty brush. Harry explains it belonged to a friend of his and offers it to her. Mezoti questions his action wondering if his friend would mind. Harry explains he is sure she would want it being used with someone with such pretty hair. Mezoti, being nice and thankful of her gift, offers Harry the chance to join her on the Holodeck. Harry smiles, suggests messing with the Vulcan program, and the two walk off hand in hand.

In a side plot, Seven of Nine attempts to handle the task of caring for the Borg children by rigidly structuring their daily activities, up to and including fun and recreation. The children continuously stray from her organized plan, out of a need for individuality. Seven's attempts to respond to this behavior with "punishment protocols" only result in further rebellion. Seven requests that someone else be assigned to the children's care. Chakotay comments that she has gone overboard with her attempts to organize the children's schedules, telling her that she is still treating them like Borg drones and that she can't always schedule fun. Her request is denied. When the children are given the task of creating clay sculptures of geometric shapes, Mezoti deviates from the assignment and instead creates a crude sculpture of Seven's head. Though it is not what she assigned, Seven accepts the deviation, claiming that it shows individuality.

Reception 
This episode was nominated for an Emmy award for outstanding makeup. "Ashes to Ashes" was also noted in the book To Boldly Go: Essays on Gender and Identity in the Star Trek Universe for its presentation of a female character.

In 2018, this episode was noted by CBR for guest starring actress Kim Rhodes, who later became more famous for other roles in her career.

In 2020, The Digital Fix praised this for good acting performance by Kim Rhodes.

Releases 
This episode was released as part of a season 6 DVD boxset on December 7, 2004.

Bibliography

External links

 

Star Trek: Voyager (season 6) episodes
2000 American television episodes
Television episodes about resurrection

it:Specie di Star Trek: Voyager#Kobali